Four discourses is a concept developed by French psychoanalyst Jacques Lacan. He argued that there were four fundamental types of discourse. He defined four discourses, which he called Master, University, Hysteric and Analyst, and suggested that these relate dynamically to one another. 

Lacan's theory of the four discourses was initially developed in 1969, perhaps in response to the events of social unrest during May 1968 in France, but also through his discovery of what he believed were deficiencies in the orthodox reading of the Oedipus complex. The four discourses theory is presented in his seminar L'envers de la psychanalyse and in Radiophonie, where he starts using "discourse" as a social bond founded in intersubjectivity. He uses the term discourse to stress the transindividual nature of language: speech always implies another subject.

Necessity of formalising psychoanalysis

Prior to the development of the four discourses, the primary guideline for clinical psychoanalysis was Freud's Oedipus complex. In Lacan's Seminar of 1969–70, Lacan argues that the terrifying Oedipal father that Freud invoked was already castrated at the point of intervention. The castration was symbolic rather than physical. In an effort to stem analysts' tendency to project their own imaginary readings and neurotic fantasies onto psychoanalysis, Lacan worked to formalise psychoanalytic theory with mathematical functions with renewed focus on the semiology of Ferdinand de Saussure. This would ensure only a minimum of teaching is lost when communicated and also provide the conceptual architecture to limit the associations of the analyst.

Structure

Discourse, in the first place, refers to a point where speech and language intersect. The four discourses represent the four possible formulations of the symbolic network which social bonds can take and can be expressed as the permutations of a four-term configuration showing the relative positions—the agent, the other, the product and the truth—of four terms, the subject, the master signifier, knowledge and objet petit a.

Positions

Agent (upper left), the speaker of the discourse.

Other (upper right), what the discourse is addressed to.

Product (lower right), what the discourse has created.

Truth (lower left), what the discourse attempted to express.

Variables

S1: the dominant, ordering and sense giving signifier of a discourse as it is received by the group, community or culture. S1 refers to "the marked circle of the field of the Other," it is the Master-Signifier. S1 comes into play in a signifying battery conforming the network of knowledge. 

S2: what is ordered by or set in motion by S1. It is knowledge, the existing body of knowledge, the knowledge of the time. 
S2 is the "battery of signifiers, already there" at the place where "one wants to determine the status of a discourse as status of statement," that is knowledge (savoir). 

$: The subject, or person, for Lacan is always barred in the sense that it is incomplete, divided. Just as we can never know the world around us except in the partial refractions of language and the domination of identification, so, too, we can never know ourselves. $ is the subject, marked by the unbroken line (trait unaire) which represents it and is different from the living individual who is not the locus of this subject. 

a: the objet petit a or surplus-jouissance. In Lacan's psychoanalytic theory, objet petit a stands for the unattainable object of desire. It is sometimes called the object cause of desire. Lacan always insisted that the term should remain untranslated, "thus acquiring the status of an algebraic sign". It is the object-waste or the loss of the object that occurred when the original division of the subject took place—the object that is the cause of desire: the plus-de-jouir.

Four Discourses

Discourse of the Master 
We see a barred subject ($) positioned as master signifier's truth, who's itself positioned as discourse's agent for all other signifiers (S2), that illustrates the structure of the dialectic of the master and the slave. The master, (S1) is the agent that puts the other, (S2) to work: the product is a surplus, objet a, that master struggles to appropriate alone. In a modern society, an example of this discourse can be found within so-called “family-like” work environments that tend to hide direct subordination under the mask of “favorable” submission to master's truth that generates value. The Master's reach for the truth in principle is fulfillment of his/her castratedness through subject's work. Based on Hegel's master–slave dialectic.

Discourse of the University
Knowledge in position of an agent is handed down by the institute which legitimises the master signifier (S1) taking the place of discourse's truth. Impossibility to satisfy one's need with a knowledge (which is a structural thing) produces a barred subject ($) as discourses sustain, and the cycle repeats itself through the primary subject being slavish to the institution values to fulfill the castratedness. The discourse's truth "knowledge " is being positioned aside of this loop and never the direct object of the subject, and the institute controls the subjects's objet a and defines the subject's master signifier's. Pathological symptom of an agent in this discourse is seeking fulfillment of their castratedness through enjoying the castratedness of their subject.

Discourse of the Analyst 
The position of an agent — the analyst — is occupied by objet a of the analysand. Analyst's silence leads to reverse hysterization, as such the analyst becomes a mirror of question himself to the analysand, thus embodies barred subject's desire that lets his symptom speak itself through speech and thus be interpreted by the analyst. The master signifier of the analysand emerges as a product of this role. Hidden knowledge, positioned as discourse's truth (S2) stands for both analyst interpretation technique and knowledge acquired from the subject.

Discourse of the Hysteric 
Despite its pathological aura, hysteric's discourse exhibits the most common mode of speech, blurring the line between clinical image and the otherness of social settings. Object a truth is defined by interrogative nature of subject's address ('Who am I?') as well as tryst for satisfaction of knowledge. This mutually drives the barred subject and turns on the agent's master signifiers. It leads the agent to produce a new knowledge (discourse's product) in a futile attempt to provide a barred subject with an answer to fulfill subject's castratedness (Lacan in Discourse of the Analyst breaks the pathological cycle of it by purposefully leaving the question unanswered, reversing the discourse and putting an analyst in a place of hysteric's desire). However, object a of the subject is search for the agent's object a, thus without being a subject like in the 'Discourse of the University' the Hysteric ends up gathering knowledge instead of their object a truth.

Relevance for cultural studies

Slavoj Žižek uses the theory to explain various cultural artefacts, including Don Giovanni and Parsifal.

See also
Demand

Notes

References

General sources
David Pavón-Cuéllar, From the Conscious Interior to an Exterior Unconscious: Lacan, Discourse Analysis and Social Psychology (Karnac, 2010). See chapter eight and especially pages 265 to 269.
For a clearer explanation see Mark Bracher. "On the psychological and social functions of language: Lacan's Theory of the Four Discourses" in Mark Bracher (ed) Lacanian Theory of Discourse: Subject, Structure and Society. (New York University Press, 1994) pp. 107–128
There is a brief explanation in Dylan Evans. An Introductory Dictionary of Lacanian Psychoanalysis. (Routledge 1996).

External links
Lacan Dot Com
"How to Read Lacan" by Slavoj Zizek – full version
 Slavoj Žižek, Jacques Lacan's Four Discourses
Chronology of Jacques Lacan
The Seminars of Jacques Lacan

Psychoanalytic terminology
Jacques Lacan
Post-structuralism
Structuralism